

Incumbents

Federal government 
 President: Muhammad Zia-ul-Haq
 Chief Justice: Mohammad Haleem

Governors 
Governor of Balochistan: Rahimuddin Khan 
Governor of Khyber Pakhtunkhwa: Fazle Haq 
Governor of Punjab: Ghulam Jilani Khan 
Governor of Sindh: S.M. Abbasi

Events 
 12 February: 1983 women's march, Lahore 
 August, September 1983: Movement for the Restoration of Democracy
 The first F-16 is inducted into the Pakistan Air Force (PAF).
 Pakistan conduct cold test of a nuclear device, proving the state as one of recognized nuclear weapons state. The test was not announced publicly until 1998.
 The Indian Army captures Siachen in a military raid.
 December 31 – The 7.2  Hindu Kush earthquake affects northern Afghanistan and Pakistan with a maximum Mercalli intensity of VII (Very strong), killing 12–26 and injuring 60–483.

Births

 24 November – Anoushay Abbasi, actress and model

Deaths
 6 December – Mir Gul Khan Nasir, politician and poet from Balochistan, Pakistan.

See also
 1982 in Pakistan
 Other events of 1983
 1984 in Pakistan
 List of Pakistani films of 1983
 Timeline of Pakistani history

References

 
1983 in Asia